Live From Hell is the fourth and final comedy album by Sam Kinison. It was released in 1993, a year after his death in an automobile accident.  The album won the Grammy Award for Best Spoken Comedy Album.

Track listing
The album contained the following tracks:

 I Missed the Joan Rivers Show     
 Execution for Pee Wee     
 Captain Kangaroo     
 Russians Are Losers     
 Sammy's Pawnshop     
 J.F.K.     
 Space Pussies     
 The Kurds     
 Willie Nelson    
 The Smart Bomb     
 100 Hour War     
 Bob Hope     
 The Pee Trough     
 Know When to Die    
 Sam's Tirade     
 Rap Sucks    
 Cable TV     
 Bad Taste     
 The Homeless     
 Don't Swallow

References

1993 live albums
Sam Kinison albums
Grammy Award for Best Comedy Album
Live albums published posthumously
Priority Records live albums
1990s comedy albums